Matvei or Matvey is the Russian language variation of Matthew. Notable people with the name include:

 Matvei Blanter (1903–1990), Russian composer of popular and film music
 Matvei Petrovich Bronstein (1906–1938), Soviet theoretical physicist
 Matvey Frantskevich (born 1995), Belarusian footballer
 Matvei Gedenschtrom (c. 1780–1845), Russian explorer of the northern parts of Siberia
 Matvei Golovinski (1865–1920), Russian-French writer, journalist, and Political activist
 Matvey Gusev (1826–1866), Russian astronomer
 Matvey Kuzmin (1858–1942), Russian peasant who was killed in World War II
 Matvey Mamykin (born 1994), Russian cyclist
 Matvey Manizer (1891–1966), Russian sculptor
 Matvei Muranov (1873–1959), Ukrainian-born Bolshevik revolutionary
 Matvey Muravyev (1784–1836), Russian explorer
 Matvei Petrov (born 1990), Russian male artistic gymnast
 Matvei Safonov (born 1999), Russian footballer
 Matvei Zakharov (1898–1972), Marshal of the Soviet Union

See also
 Matthew (name)

Russian masculine given names